Julie Stewart was a food scientist. She began working at Stouffer's Food's in 1957, first starting in the shipping department and then moving into food development. She was an aide to Doris Davis Centini at Stouffer's Food's during development of the Stouffer's portions of the Apollo 11 space crew's meals eaten in quarantine on their return from space in 1969. Her responsibilities included designing recipes, and NASA selected one of her recipes, Salisbury Stroganoff, for inclusion in the Apollo 11 crew's menu.

References

See also 
Sara Thompson (food scientist)
Doris Davis Centini

Year of birth missing
Possibly living people
Food scientists
Women food scientists
American food scientists
African-American scientists